The Amazing Race 32 is the thirty-second season of the American reality television show The Amazing Race. It featured eleven teams of two competing in a race around the world.

The season premiered on CBS on October 14, 2020, and the season finale aired on December 16, 2020.

Boyfriends Will Jardell and James Wallington were the winners of this season, while married parents Hung Nguyen and Chee Lee finished in second place, and professional volleyball players Riley McKibbin and Maddison McKibbin finished in third.

Production

Development and filming

During the airing of season 30 in January 2018, Phil Keoghan suggested that the show could return to filming two seasons a year after two years of only filming one. After season 31 completed filming in July 2018, The Amazing Race 32 began on November 10, 2018 with filming of first leg reported on the island of Tobago, marking the first time The Amazing Race visited Trinidad and Tobago. The season concluded filming on December 3, 2018 in New Orleans, Louisiana.

According to Phil Keoghan, this season was the most physically demanding to film since The Amazing Race 3. This season also saw The Amazing Race reach a milestone of traveling one million cumulative miles.

At twenty-two months, The Amazing Race 32 has the longest gap between its filming completion and its premiere. This is primarily attributed to the filming of the season prior to season 31's broadcast and the delays on the 2019–20 television season as television production was suspended following the COVID-19 pandemic. CBS first announced on April 13, 2020, that the season would originally premiere with a two-hour special on May 20, 2020, taking over the Wednesday slot of Survivor: Winners at War part of the 2019–20 TV season. Following this, the show would have returned to the standard one-hour episode format. However, on April 29, 2020, CBS announced that it was postponing the premiere until later in 2020, and the freshman game show Game On! would assume Survivor's former timeslot. The postponement was designed to allow The Amazing Race to replace shows scheduled in the 2020–21 television season whose production has not begun as a result of suspended television production following the COVID-19 pandemic.

Outside of a message from Keoghan at the start of the first episode describing the timing of filming of this season relative to the COVID-19 pandemic, the season made no other changes or mention of the pandemic. Keoghan explained this choice was made by production to keep the show evergreen.

This season was the first to eliminate the last place team during a no-rest leg. It also saw the first appearance of the Yield since the first All-Stars edition back in 2007, making this the first season to feature both the Yield and the U-Turn. The mechanics of the Yield were changed such that teams had to find an hourglass during Leg 2 that they could use later in the season to Yield another team.

Two new twists were introduced this season: the Mega Leg and City Sprint. Leg 8 featured a Mega Leg: a rebranding of the double-length leg last seen on The Amazing Race 14, which featured two Detours and two Roadblocks over the course of one leg. Leg 10 featured the City Sprint, where teams did not have to complete any Detours or Roadblocks, but rather a series of tasks that they had to complete as quickly as possible.

Casting
Unlike five of the past six seasons, which had particular themes, Phil Keoghan referred to this season as taking a "back to basics" approach with the cast and the show going back to core elements.

Cast

This cast included former Carolina Panthers players DeAngelo Williams and Gary Barnidge, Olympic hurdlers Kellie Wells-Brinkley and LaVonne Idlette, professional volleyball player Riley McKibbin, college basketball coach Jerry Eaves, and America's Next Top Model cycle 21 runner-up Will Jardell.

After Phil Keoghan announced to Will & James that they had won The Amazing Race, Will proposed to James, who accepted. Will & James were married on December 3, 2021: the three year anniversary of their Amazing Race win and their engagement.

Future appearances
In 2022, James Wallington competed on The Challenge: USA.

Results
The following teams are listed with their placements in each leg. Placements are listed in finishing order. 
A  placement with a dagger indicates that the team was eliminated. 
An  placement with a double-dagger indicates that the team was the last to arrive at a pit stop in a non-elimination leg, and had to perform a Speed Bump in the following leg. 
An italicized placement indicates a team's placement at the midpoint of a Mega Leg.
 A  indicates that the team used the Yield and a  indicates the team on the receiving end of the Yield.
 A  indicates that the team used the U-Turn and a  indicates the team on the receiving end of the U-Turn.

Notes

Race summary

Leg 1 (United States → Trinidad and Tobago)

Episode 1: "One Million Miles" (October 14, 2020)
Eliminated: Nathan & Cody
Locations
Los Angeles, California (Hollywood Bowl) (Starting Line)
 Los Angeles → Port of Spain, Trinidad and Tobago
Saint Augustine (24 Hour Fruit Stand)
Saint Augustine (Exodus Panyard)
 Port of Spain → Crown Point
 Pigeon Point (Swallows Beach → Nylon Pool)
 Pigeon Point (Nylon Pool → Pigeon Point Jetty)
Pigeon Point (Pigeon Point Beach) 
 Buccoo (Buccoo Integrated Facility) 
Episode summary
Teams set off from the Hollywood Bowl and flew to the island of Trinidad. Once there, teams had to find the 24 Hour Fruit Stand in Saint Augustine, where each team member had to roll an oil drum used to make steelpans  to a Carnival at the Exodus Panyard. There, teams had to find the Midnight Robber in order to receive their next clue, which contained tickets the next day on one of two flights to the island of Tobago.
At Swallows Beach, teams had to travel by boat to the Nylon Pool and memorize a uniquely-painted fish with a four-digit combination on their boat. Once at the pool, teams had to search amongst 125 fish for an exact match and unlock the fish in order to receive their next clue. Afterwards, they had to travel by boat back to Pigeon Point.
 In this season's first Roadblock, one team member had to learn to play a section of "Day-O" on a steelpan and then perform alongside the Redemption Sound Setters in order to receive their next clue.
After completing the Roadblock, teams had to travel to Buccoo Integrated Facility and take part in goat racing, with both team members having to run across a finish line with a goat in order to check in at the pit stop.
Additional notes
Although the last team to arrive at the pit stop was eliminated, there was no rest period at the end of the leg and all remaining teams were instead instructed to continue racing.

Leg 2 (Trinidad and Tobago → Colombia)

Episode 2: "Red Lipstick is Not My Color" (October 21, 2020)
Prize: A trip for two to Switzerland (awarded to Hung & Chee)
Eliminated: Kellie & LaVonne
Locations
 Crown Point → Bogotá, Colombia
Nemocón (Nemocón Salt Mine)
Nemocón (Templo Parroquial San Francisco de Asís)
Bogotá (Plazoleta del Rosario  Universidad del Rosario)
Bogotá (Escuela Nacional Circo Para Todos) 
Bogotá (Carrera 26 #10-03)
Bogotá (Parque Nacional Enrique Olaya Herrera) 
Episode summary
At the beginning of this leg, teams were instructed to fly to Bogotá, Colombia. Once there, teams had to travel by taxi to the Nemocón Salt Mine, where they had to search for either a 10- or 20-minute hourglass that they could use to Yield another team later in the season. They then signed up for one of two departure times the next morning, when they also received their next clue.
At the Templo Parroquial San Francisco de Asís, teams had to climb to the top of the bell tower, retrieve either an emerald or a golden raft replica, and then travel back to Bogotá to deliver either the emerald to an emerald broker at Plazoleta del Rosario or the golden raft to an archeology professor at the Universidad del Rosario in order to receive their next clue.
 In this leg's Roadblock, one team member had to dress as a clown, take a disorienting ride in a wheel of death, and then walk across a tightrope and back again without falling or dropping any items they were carrying on a tray in order to receive their next clue.
At Carrera 26 #10-03, teams had to decorate a volqueta (a dump truck) so that it matched an example, as well as hook up the truck's horn, in order to receive their next clue, which directed them to the pit stop: the Parque Nacional Enrique Olaya Herrera in Bogotá.

Leg 3 (Colombia → Brazil)

Episode 3: "We're Makin' Big Moves" (October 28, 2020)
Prize: A trip for two to Bali, Indonesia (awarded to Will & James)
Eliminated: Jerry & Frank
Locations
Bogotá (Parque Nacional Enrique Olaya Herrera) 
 Bogotá → Manaus, Brazil
Manaus (Mercado Municipal Adolpho Lisboa)
 Manaus → Tupé Reserve (Dessana Village) 
Tupé Reserve (Beach – Maloca) 
 Rio Negro (Barco Corrêa Filho) 
Episode summary
At the beginning of this leg, teams were instructed to fly to Manaus, Brazil. Once there, teams had to make their way to the Mercado Municipal Adolpho Lisboa and purchase eleven items on a list written in Portuguese, and then bring them to the dock manager at the Balsa Laranja in order to receive their next clue. Teams then had to board a boat, which took them to Dessana Village in the Amazon rainforest, with the items that they'd purchased. Once there, a chief used a blowgun to knock teams' next clue down from a tree.
 This season's first Detour was a choice between Shelter From Trees or Well Done, Please. In Shelter From Trees, teams had to carry a bundle of babassu palm leaves to the tribal chief's new house and use them to cover a section of the roof in order to receive their next clue. In Well Done, Please, teams had to use the items they'd purchased at the market to prepare a three-course meal in order to receive their next clue.
After completing the Detour, teams had to make their way to the maloca on a nearby beach, where they found their next clue directing them to the pit stop: the Barco Corrêa Filho floating on the Rio Negro.
Additional notes
 This leg featured a Double U-Turn. Will & James chose to use the U-Turn on Leo & Alana, while Kaylynn & Haley chose to use the U-Turn on Jerry & Frank.

Leg 4 (Brazil → Paraguay)

Episode 4: "Olé, Olé!" (November 4, 2020)
Prize: US$5,000 each (awarded to Will & James)
Locations
 Tupé Reserve (Dessana Village) → Manaus 
 Manaus → Asunción, Paraguay
Asunción (Palacio de los López – Asunción Sign) (Unaired)
Asunción (Cateura) 
Asunción (Mercado 4 – Tereré Vendor )
Asunción (Plaza O'Leary  Estación Central del Ferrocarril) 
Asunción (Plaza Italia) 
Episode summary
During the pit stop, the Barco Corrêa Filho traveled back to Manaus, where teams began this leg.
 In this leg's Roadblock, one team member had to assemble a cello out of recycled items for the Recycled Orchestra of Cateura in order to receive their next clue.
At Mercado 4, teams had to use a mortar and pestle to prepare enough tereré, Paraguay's national drink, to fill a thermos in order to receive their next clue.
 This leg's Detour was a Double Switchback, with both tasks originally from season 20, and was a choice between Stack Your Melons or Use Your Melon. In Stack Your Melons, teams had to travel to Plaza O'Leary and stack watermelons into a pyramid in order to receive their next clue. In Use Your Melon, teams had to travel to the Estación Central del Ferrocarril and perform a traditional Paraguayan bottle dance. Both team members had to successfully perform a choreographic routine with a glass bottle on their heads without breaking their bottles in order to receive their next clue.
Teams had to check in at the pit stop: the Plaza Italia in Asunción.
Additional notes
After arriving in Asunción, teams had to first find the Asunción Sign near Palacio de los López, where they found the clue that directed them to the Roadblock in Cateura. This task was unaired.
This was a non-elimination leg.

Leg 5 (Paraguay → France)

Episode 5: "You Don't Strike Me as a Renaissance Man" (November 11, 2020)
Prize: A trip for two to Phú Quốc, Vietnam (awarded to Riley & Maddison)
Eliminated: Michelle & Victoria
Locations
Asunción (Plaza de las Residentas) 
 Asunción → Paris, France
Chantilly (Château de Chantilly) 
Chantilly (Musée Condé) 
Chantilly (Le Vertugadin)
Paris (Musée des Arts Forains) 
Paris (Pont des Arts) 
Episode summary
At the beginning of this leg, teams were instructed to fly to Paris, France. Once there, teams had to drive to the Château de Chantilly, where they found their next clue.
 In this leg's first Roadblock, one team member had to compare the dozens of paintings in the Musée Condé with the dozens of Renaissance-styled party guests in another room of the château in order to identify one of the nine guests dressed as a character in one of the paintings. Once a match was identified, they had to bring the guest to the museum curator and tell her the name of the artist whose painting the guest matched in order to receive their next clue.
 For their Speed Bump, Kaylynn & Haley had to clean the riding gear for two of the château's horses before they could continue racing.
At Le Vertugadin, each team member had to prepare enough Crème Chantilly to fill two pies and then deliver the pies through a tent where, unbeknownst to the teams, chefs pelted them with pies in order to receive their next clue. 
 In this leg's second Roadblock, the team member who did not perform the previous Roadblock had to win three 19th-century carnival games at the Musée des Arts Forains before retrieving their next clue from the shooting gallery, which directed teams to the pit stop: the Pont des Arts in Paris.

Leg 6 (France → Germany)

Episode 6: "I'm Not Even Walking, I'm Falling" (November 18, 2020)
US$7,500 each (awarded to DeAngelo & Gary)
Locations
Paris (Place Vendôme) 
 Paris → Berlin, Germany
Berlin (East Side Gallery)
Berlin (Teledisko)
Berlin (Andel's Hotel) 
Berlin (Ballhaus Berlin  Bieryoga) 
Berlin (Neukölln) 
Episode summary
At the beginning of this leg, teams were instructed to travel by train to Berlin, Germany. Once there, teams had to find their next clue in a suitcase marked with an Amazing Race ribbon at the East Side Gallery. 
Teams had to drive an East German Trabant from the gallery to the Teledisko and dance for three minutes until the music stopped in order to receive a photograph with their next clue.
 In this leg's Roadblock, one team member had to rappel face-first nearly  down the Andel's Hotel and memorize flashing letters which they had to unscramble once on the ground to spell a word – Sauerkraut – in order to receive their next clue.
 This leg's Detour was a choice between Belt It Out or Belch It Out. In Belt It Out, teams had to dress as chickens and correctly sing the German lyrics to "Ich wollt' ich wär' ein Huhn" ("I Wish I Were a Chicken") with the Berlin Comedian Harmonists in order to receive their next clue. In Belch It Out, teams had to lead a beer yoga class, which involved naming and completing four couples' yoga poses while drinking beer, in order to receive their next clue.
Teams had to check in at the pit stop in Neukölln.
Additional notes
This was a non-elimination leg.

Leg 7 (Germany → Kazakhstan)

Episode 7: "Give Me a Beard Bump" (November 18, 2020)
Prize: A trip for two to Las Vegas, Nevada (awarded to Will & James)
Eliminated: Leo & Alana
Locations
Berlin (InterContinental Berlin) 
 Berlin → Almaty, Kazakhstan
Almaty (Kazakhfilm Studio)  
Karasay District (Nomad Village) 
Almaty (Zelenyi Bazaar)
Almaty (First President's Park) 
Episode summary
At the beginning of this leg, teams were instructed to fly to Almaty, Kazakhstan. Once there, teams had to travel to the Kazakhfilm Studio in order to find their next clue.
 This leg's Detour was a choice between Great Khan's Spy or Knock Out Guy. In Great Khan's Spy, teams had to watch an elaborate action sequence and correctly answer a series of questions from the actor portraying Genghis Khan in order to receive their next clue. If they answered any of the questions incorrectly, they had to watch the action sequence again before making another attempt. In Knock Out Guy, teams had to perform a choreographed fight scene before breaking a clay vase in order to retrieve their next clue.
 For their Speed Bump, Kaylynn & Haley had to apply prosthetic beards to each other before they could continue racing.
In a nomad village, teams found their next clue, which instructed them to lead a camel laden with possessions to an empty yurt. There, teams had to set up the interior so that it matched an example, which included procuring a boiled sheep's head from the nomads, in order to receive their next clue. Teams were then directed to the Zelenyi Bazaar, where they had to search the meat market for their next clue, which directed them to the pit stop at First President's Park.
Additional notes
 Kaylynn & Haley chose to use the Yield on Leo & Alana.

Leg 8 (Kazakhstan → India)

Episode 8: "Are You a Rickshaw?" &Episode 9: "This is Not Payback, This is Karma" (November 25, 2020)
Prize: A seven-day Eastern Caribbean cruise for two (awarded to Riley & Maddison)
Eliminated: Kaylynn & Haley
Locations
Almaty (Hotel Royal Tulip) 
 Almaty → Hyderabad, India
Hyderabad (Multi Cuisine Restaurant)
Hyderabad (The Platina  T-Hub) 
Hyderabad (Qutb Shahi Tombs – Muhammad Quli Qutb Shah Mausoleum)  
Hyderabad (Charminar) 
Hyderabad (Laad Bazaar  Iqbal Dentist) 
Hyderabad (Taj Falaknuma Palace)   
Episode summary (Episode 8)
At the beginning of this leg, teams were instructed to fly to Hyderabad, India. Once there, teams had to smog test three auto rickshaws in order to receive their next clue.
 This leg's first Detour was a choice between Food App or Number Trap. In Food App, teams had to pick up three Swiggy food orders from a restaurant and deliver them to the correct addresses as instructed to them by a phone operator in order to receive their next clue. In Number Trap, teams had to capture all of the highlighted ones and zeros on a motion detecting screen and then use the numbers to crack a binary code that led them to their next clue.
After completing the first Detour, teams found their next clue at the Qutb Shahi Tombs.
 In this leg's first Roadblock, one team member had to use an augmented reality feature on a tablet computer to find three virtual men wearing turbans and standing in front of the tomb's columns. They then had to find the matching men atop the tomb and place them above the correct columns in order to receive three scrolls that they could exchange for their next clue.
Episode summary (Episode 9)
After completing the first Roadblock, teams found their next clue at the Charminar.
 This leg's second Detour was a Blind Detour, where teams only learned about the task that they chose once they arrived at its location, and was a choice between This or That. In This, teams had to push a cart of bangles to a store and then find a set of seven bangles that matched the ones worn by a bride in order to receive their next clue. In That, teams had to make a dental impression of a patient's teeth and then polish a set of dentures before fitting them into another patient's mouth in order to receive their next clue.
At the Taj Falaknuma Palace, teams had to don sherwani outfits and then travel by horse and carriage with a pair of socialites to their next clue.
 In this leg's second Roadblock, one team member had to prepare ten place settings on a section of India's longest table to the exacting standards for a royal dinner in order to receive their next clue, which directed them to the nearby pit stop.
Additional notes
Leg 8 was a Mega Leg spread out over two episodes, both of which aired back-to-back on the same night.
 Will & James chose to use the Yield on Kaylynn & Haley during the first half of this leg.
 Riley & Maddison chose to also use the Yield on Kaylynn & Haley during the second half of this leg.

Leg 9 (India → Cambodia)

Episode 10: "Getting Down to the Nitty Gritty" (December 2, 2020)
Prize: A trip for two to Bergen, Norway (awarded to Riley & Maddison)
Eliminated: Eswar & Aparna
Locations
Hyderabad (Taj Falaknuma Palace) 
 Hyderabad → Siem Reap, Cambodia
Siem Reap (Psah Chas)
 Siem Reap → Tonlé Sap (Silat Tik Meas Buddhist Temple)
 Tonlé Sap (Chong Kneas Village) 
 Tonlé Sap (Floating Restaurant) 
Siem Reap (Khmer Floor Handicraft) 
Siem Reap (Angkor Thom) 
Episode summary
At the beginning of this leg, teams were instructed to fly to Siem Reap, Cambodia. Once there, teams went to Psah Chas to find a marked tuk-tuk with a Travelocity Roaming Gnome, a basket of donations, and their next clue, which instructed them to attach their tuk-tuk to a motorbike and travel to Chong Kneas Pier. There, they had to search for their next clue, which instructed teams to travel by long-tail boat to Silat Tik Meas Buddhist Temple and respectfully give their basket of donations to a monk in order to receive their next clue.
 This season's final Detour was a choice between Fish or Farm. In Fish, teams had to pull a  fishing net and collect at least  of fish in order to receive their next clue. In Farm, teams had to mix a combination of compost and soil, plant a garden of local produce on a floating platform so as to match an example floating garden, and then plant seeds from their gnome's satchel in order to receive their next clue.
After completing the Detour, teams had to travel by long-tail boat to a floating restaurant in order to find their next clue, which instructed teams to return to Siem Reap and travel to Khmer Floor Handicraft in order to find their next clue.
 In this leg's Roadblock, one team member had to make an encaustic cement tile. They then had to use a key from the gnome's satchel to unlock a chest of sliding puzzle pieces that they had to solve in order to receive their next clue.
Teams had to check in at the pit stop: the east gate of Angkor Thom.
Additional notes
 This leg featured a Double U-Turn. DeAngelo and Gary chose to use the U-Turn on Eswar & Aparna, while Riley & Maddison attempted to use the U-Turn on DeAngelo & Gary. However, DeAngelo & Gary had already passed the U-Turn by this point and were therefore unaffected.

Leg 10 (Cambodia → Philippines)

Episode 11: "Run on Your Tippy Toes" (December 9, 2020)
Eliminated: DeAngelo & Gary
Locations
Siem Reap (Angkor Century Resort and Spa) 
 Siem Reap → Manila, Philippines
 Manila (Rizal Park – Lapu-Lapu Circle)
 Pasay (Intersection of Macapagal Boulevard & Epifanio de los Santos Avenue) 
 Pasay (Mall of Asia)
Manila (Binondo – Arch of Goodwill)
Manila (Manila Central Post Office)
Manila (Liwasang Bonifacio)
Manila (Mehan Garden)
Manila (Rizal Park – Lapu-Lapu Circle) 
Episode summary
At the beginning of this leg, teams were instructed to fly to Manila, Philippines. Once there, teams boarded a jeepney that transported them to Lapu-Lapu Circle, where they were greeted by Phil Keoghan. He informed them that this leg would be a City Sprint, meaning teams would have to complete a series of challenges before returning to Lapu-Lapu Circle, which would serve as the leg's pit stop, and there would be no Detours or Roadblocks. Phil then informed teams to find their next clue in a marked jeepney near Rizal Park.
After the City Sprint started, teams had to solve a riddle that led them to dancing traffic enforcer Ramiro Hinojas at the intersection of Macapagal Boulevard and Epifanio de los Santos Avenue, and had to grab their next clue from Hinojas as they drove past him.
Outside the Mall of Asia, teams had to run one lap around the esplanade while wearing high-heeled shoes in order to receive their next clue.
After passing through the Arch of Goodwill, teams had to search Binondo for the one lion dancer out of four who had their next clue in its mouth.
Outside the Manila Central Post Office, teams were instructed to prepare feed for a horse attached to a kalesa in Liwasang Bonifacio by obtaining ingredients from three nearby vendors in order to receive their next clue.
At Mehan Garden, teams had to listen to a band playing four songs that they had heard earlier in the race. They then had to find the four instrument cases marked with the flags of the respective countries where they'd heard the songs, and then present them to the band in the order that they visited the countries, and not the order that the band was playing the music, in order to receive their next clue.
{|class="wikitable unsortable" style="text-align:left"
|-
! scope="col" | Leg
! scope="col" | Flag
! scope="col" | Music
|-
! scope="row" | 1
| 
| "Day-O"
|-
! scope="row" | 2
| 
| "Entrance of the Gladiators"
|-
! scope="row" | 4
| 
| "Pájaro Campana"
|-
! scope="row" | 5
| 
| French Renaissance music
|}
Additional notes
Filipino basketball player E.J. Feihl appeared as the pit stop greeter during this leg.

Leg 11 (Philippines → United States)

Episode 12: "Now It's About Winning" (December 16, 2020)
Winners: Will & James
Second Place: Hung & Chee
Third Place: Riley & Maddison
Locations
Manila (Rizal Park – Lapu-Lapu Circle) 
 Manila → New Orleans, Louisiana
New Orleans (Louis Armstrong Park)
New Orleans (French Quarter – Bourbon Street)
New Orleans (French Quarter – Cafe Beignet) 
New Orleans (New Orleans Morial Convention Center)
New Orleans (Crescent City Connection) 
New Orleans (Mardi Gras World)
New Orleans (Mercedes-Benz Superdome) 
Episode summary
At the beginning of this leg, teams were instructed to fly to New Orleans, Louisiana. Once there, teams had to travel to Louis Armstrong Park, where they found their next clue, which directed them to Bourbon Street. Teams had to climb atop a Mardi Gras parade float and collect beads thrown at them from nearby balconies until one team member had 50 red beads and the other had 50 gold beads in order to receive their next clue.
 In this leg's first Roadblock, teams had to join a Dixieland band and play vest frottoirs until they reached the Cafe Beignet, where one team member had to search through king cakes until they found a small king cake baby inside one of the cakes. Both team members had to then eat six beignets between the two of them in order to receive their next clue.
There, teams had to search the warehouse for a crate with 32 panels that they had to attach to their ball so as to create a giant globe and then place it upright on a float in order to receive their final clue.
The teams' final clue told them to find the finish line where "the Saints go marching in", referring to the NFL team's home stadium: the Mercedes-Benz Superdome.

Reception

Critical response
The Amazing Race 32 received mixed reviews. Andy Dehnart of reality blurred wrote that the season was "imperfect but thoroughly enjoyable" and that the biggest letdown of the season was the Mine Five alliance. Justin Fedich of Screen Rant called the season a "standout" and praised the diversity in casting and the gameplay and engagement of winners Will & James. Mack Rawden of CinemaBlend criticized seeing "an entire season controlled and ultimately ruined by an alliance". Matt Roush of TV Insider criticized the answer-sharing among the "Mine Five" alliance saying that it felt like "cheating on a test" and that it "soured" the season. In response to criticism from critics and fans about answer-sharing among alliance members, Amazing Race co-creator and executive producer Elise Doganieri stated in an interview after the season that the show was considering challenge-specific rules to limit answer-sharing.

Ratings
U.S. Nielsen ratings

Canadian ratings
Canadian broadcaster CTV also aired The Amazing Race on Wednesdays.

Canadian DVR ratings are included in Numeris's count.

References

External links

 32
2020 American television seasons
Television series impacted by the COVID-19 pandemic
Television shows filmed in Los Angeles
Television shows filmed in Trinidad and Tobago
Television shows filmed in Colombia
Television shows filmed in Amazonas (Brazilian state)
Television shows filmed in Paraguay
Television shows filmed in France
Television shows filmed in Germany
Television shows filmed in Kazakhstan
Television shows filmed in India
Television shows filmed in Cambodia
Television shows filmed in the Philippines
Television shows filmed in New Orleans